Leopoldo Baracco (9 October 1886 - 13 January 1966) was an Italian politician.

Baracco was born in Asti, and represented the Christian Democracy party in the Constituent Assembly of Italy from 1946 to 1948 and in the Senate of the Republic from 1948 to 1968.

References

1886 births
1966 deaths
People from Asti
Christian Democracy (Italy) politicians
Members of the Constituent Assembly of Italy
Senators of Legislature I of Italy
Baracco
Baracco
Baracco
Politicians of Piedmont